The Complete Studio Recordings is a box set compilation by guitarist Joe Satriani released on April 22, 2014 through Legacy Recordings. It contains all fourteen of Satriani's studio albums recorded between 1986 and 2013, and also includes a bonus album named Added Creations and Bonus Tracks which contains alternate takes, remixes and one-off tracks. All fifteen albums also appear digitally remastered on two USB sticks stored in a lifelike sculpture of Satriani's head, dubbed the "Chrome Dome", in a limited run of 500, which was exclusively available through Satriani's website.

Track listing
All songs written by Joe Satriani except where noted.

References

External links
satriani.com

Joe Satriani compilation albums
2014 compilation albums
Legacy Recordings compilation albums